Zoarces is a genus of marine ray-finned fishes belonging to the family Zoarcidae, the eelpouts. It is the only genus in the subfamily Zoarcinae. These eelpouts are found in the northern Atlantic and northern Pacific Oceans.

Taxonomy
Zoarces was first proposed as a genus in 1829 by the French zoologist Georges Cuvier. Blennius viviparus, which had been described in 1758 by Linnaeus in the tenth edition of his Systema Naturae from "European seas". was subsequently designated as the type species. Zoarces is the only genus classified within the subfamily Zoarcinae, one of 4 subfamilies in the family Zoarcidae.

Etymology
Zoarces means "viviparous", i.e. giving birth to live young, however these fishes are ovoviviparous.

Species
Zoarces contains the following species:
Zoarces americanus (Bloch and Schneider, 1801) - ocean pout
 Zoarces andriashevi Parin, Grigoryev & Karmovskaya, 2005
 Zoarces elongatus Kner, 1868
 Zoarces fedorovi Chereshnev, Nazarkin & Chegodayeva, 2007
 Zoarces gillii Jordan and Starks, 1905 - blotched eelpout
 Zoarces viviparus (Linnaeus, 1758) - viviparous eelpout

Characteristics
Zoarces eelpouts are characterised by having an elongated body and tail with between 101 and 1456 vertebrae, each with a single epural which has two rays. The branchiostegal membrane is joined to the isthmus. They have an interorbital pore. The caudal fin contains between 9 and 11 fin rays. The are 6 suborbital bones form a semicircle around the eye. There are sharp, stiff spines at the rear of the dorsal fin, although infrequently this is absent in one species.

Distribution and habitat

References

External links
 

 
Zoarcidae
Extant Pleistocene first appearances
Taxa named by Georges Cuvier